Siejka is a surname. Notable people with the surname include:

 Harry Siejka (born 1992), Australian rugby league footballer
 Jo Siejka (born 1980), Australian politician
 Lucyna Siejka (born 1962), Polish field hockey player

Polish-language surnames